Clinton Lake State Recreation Area is an Illinois state park on  in DeWitt County, Illinois, United States.

References

State parks of Illinois
Protected areas of DeWitt County, Illinois
Protected areas established in 1978
1978 establishments in Illinois